Gurdev Singh Gill is a former Indian football player. He hails from Punjab. He was honoured with Arjuna Award, the highest sports  award in India in the year 1978 for his achievements as a football player. He is one of the three Punjabi football players to have received this prestigious award. He retired as a Commandant from Punjab Police in 2008. Settled now in Jalandhar and occasionally in Canada.

Club career
Leaders Football Club, Jalandhar : 1970 to 1973
Punjab Police Football Club, Jalandhar : 1974 to 1990
East Bengal Football Club Calcutta : 1978

Early career
Played for Rajput High School, Village Binjon, District. Hoshiarpur.
Graduated from Guru Gobind Singh Khalsa College, Mahilpur.
Represented Indian Football team while studying at SGGS Khalsa College, Mahilpur.

Professional career
Played for Leaders Football Club, Jalandhar : 1970 to 1973
Joined Punjab Police : 1974
Played for Punjab Police Football team : 1974 to 1990
Played for East Bengal Football Club, Calcutta : 1978
Coach Punjab Police Football team : 1990 to 2000
Coach Indian Police Football team at World police games, Nepal : 2001 (bronze medal)
Santosh Trophy : 1970 Punjab won it
Santosh Trophy held at Jalandhar : 1974 Punjab beat Bengal 6-0 in the finals (record still holds till today)
Retired as Superintendent of Police, Punjab Police : 2008

International career
Asia Cup : 1970
Asian Games Tehran, Iran : 1974
Asian Games Bangkok, Thailand : 1978 (Captain)
Agha Khan Gold Cup, Indonesia : 1977 (hattrick against Bangladesh)
Kings Cup, Seoul, South Korea (goal against South Korea, 45 yards)
Meddreka Soccer, D'jakarta : 1976
World Police Games, Nepal : 2001 (Coach) : bronze medal
Afghan Jashan Celebration tournament, Kabul : 1975
Pre-olympics in Rangoon, Burma : 1972
President Gold Cup, Singapore : 1976

Life outside football
He retired as a Commandant of Police from Punjab Police in 2008.
Served as Sports Secretary of Punjab Police from 2000–2004.
Coached Punjab Police Football team that won All India Police Games between 2000-2006.
Member Punjab Football Association Selection Committee.
Organises a big Football tournament at his village Kharar Achharwal, every year.

Family
Father - S. Kishan Singh Gill deceased in 2009.
Mother - Smt. Chanan Kaur Gill deceased in 2007.
Wife - Gurdev Kaur Gill deceased in 1995.
Sons - Surjeet Singh Gill and Ajitpal Singh Gill (Canada).
Daughter in law - Ramandeep Kaur Gill (Canada), Mandip Kaur Gill (Canada)
Grandsons - Angad Singh Gill, Arjan Singh Gill, Kishan Singh Gill (Canada)

Honours
 Recipient of Arjuna Award : 1978
 Recipient of Maharaja Ranjit Singh Award : 1984
 Recipient of President Police Medal for Meritorious Service : 2000
 Footballer of the Millennium by Delhi Sports Journalists' Association : 2000

References

External links 
   - Recipients Of Arjuna Award
  Profile at Chabbewal-Mahilpur.com
  - Official site of Punjab Football Association (PFA)
 
   - Achievements of Punjab Police football
  - Article about Punjabi Football Players in East Bengal & Mohan Bagan
  - Old data about Punjabi Football Players in various International tournaments
  - Indian Football Hall Of Fame

1950 births
Living people
Footballers from Punjab, India
Indian footballers
India international footballers
Recipients of the Arjuna Award
Association football defenders
East Bengal Club players
Footballers at the 1974 Asian Games
Footballers at the 1978 Asian Games
Asian Games competitors for India